Frank Launder (28 January 1906 – 23 February 1997) was a British writer, film director and producer, who made more than 40 films, many of them in collaboration with Sidney Gilliat.

Early life and career
He was born in Hitchin, Hertfordshire, England and worked briefly as a clerk before becoming an actor and then a playwright.

He began working as a screenwriter on British films in the 1930s, contributing the original story for the classic Will Hay comedy Oh, Mr Porter! (1937).

Sidney Gilliat
Launder first collaborated with Gilliat in 1936 on the film Seven Sinners. After writing a number of screenplays with Gilliat, including The Lady Vanishes (1938) for Alfred Hitchcock, and Night Train to Munich for Carol Reed; the two men wrote and directed the wartime drama Millions Like Us (1943).

After founding their own production company Individual Pictures, they produced a number of memorable dramas and thrillers including I See a Dark Stranger (1945) and Green for Danger (1946), but were best known for their comedies including The Happiest Days of Your Life (1950) and most famously, the St Trinian's series, based on Ronald Searle's cartoons set in an anarchic girls school.

After The Happiest Years of Our Life Launder focused entirely on comedy.

According to the British Film Institute 'over a hundred films feature either or in the credits, nearly forty feature both' but this large number was not 'at the expense of quality'.

Personal life
He was married secondly to actress Bernadette O'Farrell from 1950 until his death in Monaco. The couple had two children. Launder also had two children from his first marriage.

Selected films

 Under the Greenwood Tree (1929) writer
 Children of Chance (1930) writer
 The W Plan (1930) writer
 Hobson's Choice (1931) writer
 Keepers of Youth (1931) writer
 The Woman Between (1931) writer
 Children of Fortune (1931) writer
 After Office Hours (1932) writer
 Josser in the Army (1932) writer
 For the Love of Mike (1932) writer
 Hawley's of High Street (1933) writer
 Facing the Music (1933) writer
 A Southern Maid (1933) writer
 Those Were the Days (1933) writer
 Get Off My Foot (1935) writer
 Rolling Home (1935) writer
 The Black Mask (1935) writer
 Emil and the Detectives (1935) writer
 Educated Evans (1936) writer
 Twelve Good Men (1936)
 Where's Sally? (1936) writer
 Don't Get Me Wrong (1937) writer
 Oh, Mr Porter! (1937) story
 The Lady Vanishes (1938) writer
 Night Train to Munich (1940) writer
 They Came by Night (1940) writer
 The Young Mr. Pitt (1942) writer
 Millions Like Us (1943) writer/director/producer
 Two Thousand Women (1944) writer/director
 I See a Dark Stranger (1945) writer/director
 Green for Danger (1946) producer
 Captain Boycott (1947) writer/director
 The Blue Lagoon (1949) writer/director/producer
 The Happiest Days of Your Life (1950) writer/director/producer
 Folly to Be Wise (1952) writer/director/producer
 The Story of Gilbert and Sullivan (1953) producer
 The Belles of St. Trinian's (1954) writer/director/producer
 The Constant Husband (1955) producer
 Geordie (1955) co-writer/producer
 The Green Man (1956) writer/producer
 Blue Murder at St Trinian's (1957) writer/director/producer
 Left Right and Centre (1959) writer/producer
 The Bridal Path (1959) writer/director/producer
 The Pure Hell of St Trinian's (1960) writer/director/producer
 Joey Boy (1965) writer/director
 The Great St Trinian's Train Robbery (1966) writer/director
 The Wildcats of St Trinian's (1980) writer/director

References

External links

 BritMovie: Individual Pictures; The cinema of Launder and Gilliat
 George Sandulescu, ed., Film Director Frank Launder's Last Interview, Contemporary Literature Press, 2012

1906 births
1997 deaths
English expatriates in Monaco
English film directors
English film producers
English male screenwriters
People from Hitchin
20th-century English screenwriters
20th-century English male writers
20th-century English businesspeople